Nyctonympha flavipes is a species of beetle in the family Cerambycidae. It was described by Per Olof Christopher Aurivillius in 1920. It is known from Bolivia, Ecuador, Brazil, and Peru.

References

Forsteriini
Beetles described in 1920